F. Badger Ives (November 21, 1858 – January 21, 1914) was an American businessman and politician.

Biography
Born in New London, Wisconsin, Ives moved to Oshkosh, Wisconsin in 1871. He went to Oshkosh Business College and Oshkosh Normal School (now University of Wisconsin–Oshkosh). He was in the grocery and fruit business. Between 1890 and 1894, Ives lived in Chicago, Illinois and worked in the fruit business. He also went to the University of Chicago Law School. In 1894, Ives returned to Oshkosh and started his own business. Ives served on the Oshkosh Common Council and was a Republican. In 1899, Ives served in the Wisconsin State Assembly. He died in Oshkosh in 1914.

Notes

1858 births
1914 deaths
Politicians from Chicago
People from New London, Wisconsin
Politicians from Oshkosh, Wisconsin
University of Chicago Law School alumni
University of Wisconsin–Oshkosh alumni
Businesspeople from Chicago
Businesspeople from Wisconsin
Wisconsin city council members
19th-century American businesspeople
Republican Party members of the Wisconsin State Assembly